The list of shipwrecks in 1942 includes all ships sunk, foundered, grounded, or otherwise lost during 1942.

January

February

March

April

May

June

July

August

September

October

November

December

Unknown date

References

See also
 List of shipwrecks

1942
Shipwrecks